QUEL is a relational database query language, based on tuple relational calculus, with some similarities to SQL.  It was created as a part of the Ingres DBMS effort at University of California, Berkeley, based on Codd's earlier suggested but not implemented Data Sub-Language ALPHA.  QUEL was used for a short time in most products based on the freely available Ingres source code, most notably in an implementation called POSTQUEL supported by POSTGRES. As Oracle and DB2 gained market share in the early 1980s, most companies then supporting QUEL moved to SQL instead. QUEL continues to be available as a part of the Ingres DBMS, although no QUEL-specific language enhancements have been added for many years.

Usage
QUEL statements are always defined by tuple variables, which can be used to limit queries or return result sets.  Consider this example, taken from one of the first original Ingres papers:

range of E is EMPLOYEE
retrieve into W
(COMP = E.Salary / (E.Age - 18))
where E.Name = "Jones"
Here E is a tuple variable that ranges over the EMPLOYEE relation, and all tuples in that relation are found which satisfy the qualification `E.Name = "Jones"`. The result of the query is a new relation W, which has a single domain COMP that has been calculated for each qualifying tuple. Additional queries can then be made against the relation W.

An equivalent SQL statement is:

create table W as
select (E.salary / (E.age - 18)) as COMP
from employee as E
where E.name = 'Jones'

In this example, the relation is being stored in a new table W. This is not a direct analog of the QUEL version; relations in QUEL are more similar to temporary tables seen in most modern SQL implementations.

Here is a sample of a simple session that creates a table, inserts a row into it, and then retrieves and modifies the data inside it and finally deletes the row that was added (assuming that name is a unique field).

Another feature of QUEL was a built-in system for moving records en-masse into and out of the system. Consider this command:
copy student(name=c0, comma=d1, age=c0, comma=d1, sex=c0, comma=d1, address=c0, nl=d1)
into "/student.txt"
which creates a comma-delimited file of all the records in the student table. The d1 indicates a delimiter, as opposed to a data type. Similar commands are available in many SQL systems, but usually as external tools, as opposed to being internal to the SQL language. This makes them unavailable to stored procedures.

QUEL has an extremely powerful aggregation capability.  Aggregates can be nested, and different aggregates can have independent by-lists and/or restriction clauses.  For example:
retrieve (a=count(y.i by y.d where y.str = "ii*" or y.str = "foo"), b=max(count(y.i by y.d)))
In contrast, SQL uses  only for exact matches, while  is used when pattern matching is required.

See also
 D4 (programming language) (an implementation of D)
 Relational algebra
 Relational calculus

References

Further reading
 C. J. Date: A Critique of the SQL Database Language. SIGMOD Record 14(3): 8-54, 1984.

Database management systems
Query languages
PostgreSQL
Relational database management systems